The Antrim Senior Football Championship is an annual Gaelic Athletic Association competition between the top Gaelic football clubs in Antrim GAA. The winners of the championship represent Antrim in the Ulster Senior Club Football Championship.

The current (2022) champions are Erin's Own GAC, Cargin, who have won the title on Eleven occasions.

Wins listed by club

Finals listed by year

References

External links
 Antrim at ClubGAA
 Official Antrim GAA Website

 
Senior Gaelic football county championships